Baek So-hyun (Korean: 백소현, born November 18, 1996), known professionally as Seori (Korean: 서리), is a South Korean singer-songwriter under the label ATISPAUS. She made her solo debut on May 12, 2020, with the extended play ?Depacse Ohw.

Prior to her official debut, she often uploaded song covers to YouTube, because she wanted to see how her voice was received by others.

Biography 
"Seori" is a Korean term for "frost" that can also refer to the action of stealing. The singer says: "I chose the name at first because I liked how frost looks on windows but how it's still clear and transparent. It also means 'to steal', and I wanted it to mean that I hope to steal people's hearts with my music."

She started making her own music when she was 17 as she couldn't imagine herself doing anything but music. Before launching herself into the K-pop world, Seori needed to lay a solid foundation. After months of experimenting on social media and releasing covers to YouTube, Seori was contacted by numerous labels, including the then-artist-less record label ATISPAUS in South Korea. Despite their lack of experience and an unconventional audition, Seori felt a connection with the firm.

She considered her voice to be laid-back, smooth and dreamy. When she sang, she felt happy, but the majority of her happiness came from crafting her own songs.

Avril Lavigne, who she has admired since she was 11 years old, is her ideal collaborator. Seori claims she would be thrilled if Lavigne, who encouraged her to pursue a career in music, knew who she was, let alone if she could collaborate with her. "In the future, I'd like to create songs that express my style of alt-rock as well."

Career 
The singer had collaborated with several top K-pop artists in 2021, including Tomorrow X Together and former Day6 member eaJ. And in 2022, Seori joined Mamamoo's Moonbyul on her single "Shutdown" from her third solo mini-album 6equence.

In 2022, Seori became the first Korean female soloist to feature in the Grammy's Global Spin series.

Discography

Single albums

Extended plays

Singles

Producing and writing credits 
All credits adapted from KOMCA, unless otherwise noted.

Notes

References

External links 

 Official website
 Seori on Instagram
 Seori on YouTube

Living people
K-pop singers
South Korean women pop singers
21st-century South Korean women singers
1996 births